Bejan Jehanjir Daruwalla (11 July 1931 – 29 May 2020) was an Indian English professor and astrology columnist. Daruwalla was a Ganesha devotee and practiced various divination systems.

Son: Chirag Daruwalla

Biography 
A former English professor of Parsi heritage, Daruwalla was an ardent follower of Ganesha.

Bejan Daruwalla died on 29 May 2020 in Ahmedabad, India. After the news of his death emerged, several media reports suggested that he had died due to COVID-19. His astrologer-son, Nastur, told The Times of India that his father had pneumonia and lung infection, and the oxygen level in his body had dipped.

Work 
Daruwalla's divination practices included Numerology, Hindu astrology, Palmistry, I Ching, Tarot card reading, Kabbalah and Western astrology.

Daruwalla summed up his general approach and technique of making predictions like this, "First of all, if the person is there I look at him and get vibrations. Secondly, the time the person comes is important. Thirdly, what type of day is it? Good, bad or indifferent? Fourth, lines on the palm. Fifth, the Indian horoscope and lastly, the western horoscope. So all this goes into a computer called the brain. And after that I look at Ganesha and make a prediction."

Awards
 Lifetime Achievement Award by Ahmedabad Parsi Panchayat
 Eminence awards 2019 by Chief Minister of Gujarat Shri Vijay Rupani

References

External links
 Bejan Daruwalla on YouTube

Indian astrologers
Indian astrological writers
Hindu astrologers
Parsi people
1931 births
2020 deaths
Parsi writers
Zoroastrian astrologers
Deaths from the COVID-19 pandemic in India